is a 1956 Japanese horror film directed by Bin Kado and produced by Daiei Film. It was filmed in black-and-white in the Academy ratio format.

Cast 
 Shintaro Katsu as Minami Sanjiro

See also 
 Japanese horror

References

External links 
 
 

Japanese horror films
1956 films
Japanese black-and-white films
Daiei Film films
1956 horror films
1950s fantasy films
1950s ghost films
1950s Japanese films